3 Watch It Go is the third home video by American heavy metal band Pantera. It was released on VHS through Elektra Records on November 11, 1997. The video features band footage and includes music videos for "Planet Caravan", "I'm Broken" and "5 Minutes Alone" from the studio album Far Beyond Driven (1994), and for "Drag the Waters" from The Great Southern Trendkill (1996). It won a 1997 Metal Edge Readers' Choice Award for Best Video Cassette.

3 Watch It Go was re-released on DVD, along with the two previous home videos of the band (Cowboys from Hell: The Videos and Vulgar Video), in the form of 3 Vulgar Videos from Hell.

Track listing 
"I'm Broken"
"5 Minutes Alone"
"Drag the Waters"
"Planet Caravan"

Personnel 
Phil Anselmo – vocals
Dimebag Darrell – guitar, director, film, footage
Rex Brown – bass
Vinnie Paul – drums
Daryl "Bobby Tongs" Arnberger – director, film, footage
David Lockard – assistant director
Alyson Careaga – producer
Erinn Williams – executive producer
Brian Hicks – editor
Ronny Gordon – editor
Arnold Branch – online editor
Rob Toscano – assistant online editor
Daniel Ricci – audio mix, sound design
Chris Floberg – additional audio engineering
Aaron Barnes – additional footage
Jeff Judd – additional footage

Certifications

See also
Pantera video albums

References

Pantera albums
1997 video albums
Music video compilation albums
1997 compilation albums
Elektra Records compilation albums
Elektra Records video albums